Charles William "Charlie" Miller is a Republican member of the North Carolina House of Representatives who has represented the 19th district (including parts of Brunswick and New Hanover counties) since 2021. Miller previously served on there Brunswick County School board. Miller was elected to the North Carolina House in 2020 after legislate mid-decade redistricting created a new district.

Electoral history

Committee assignments

2021-2022 session
Appropriations
Appropriations - Education
Education - K-12
Energy and Public Utilities (Vice Chair)
Judiciary 3 (Vice Chair)
Transportation

References

External links

Living people
Year of birth missing (living people)
People from Southport, North Carolina
Republican Party members of the North Carolina House of Representatives
21st-century American politicians